La passione di Gesù Cristo is an oratorio by composer Antonio Salieri that uses a libretto by Metastasio. While many composer's set music to this libretto,  Metastasio is recorded to have said before Joseph II, Holy Roman Emperor that Salieri's setting "was the most expressive of any written on this poem." The work premiered in Vienna, Austria during the advent season of 1776.

In 2004 Capriccio released a recording of the work by the Das Neue Orchester and Chorus Musicus Köln  under conductor Christoph Spering with soloists Melba Ramos, Hanno Müller-Brachmann, Franziska Gottwald, and Florian Mock.

References

Compositions by Antonio Salieri
1776 compositions
Music based on the Bible
Salieri